This is a list of sportspeople who also worked as politicians and vice versa.

Africa

Algeria

Egypt

Gambia

Ghana

Ivory Coast

Kenya

Liberia

Morocco

Nigeria

Seychelles

South Africa

Uganda

Asia

Afghanistan

China

Hong Kong

Georgia

India

Indonesia

Iran

Iraq

Japan

Kazakhstan

Malaysia

Mongolia

Pakistan

Philippines

South Korea

Sri Lanka

Taiwan

Thailand

Turkey

Europe

Albania

Austria

Belgium

Bulgaria

Croatia

Denmark

Faroe Islands

Estonia

Finland

France

Germany

Greece

Hungary

Iceland

Ireland

Italy

Luxembourg

Montenegro

Netherlands

Norway

Poland

Romania

Russia

San Marino

Slovakia

Slovenia

Spain

Sweden

Switzerland

Ukraine

United Kingdom

North America

Antigua and Barbuda

Bahamas

Barbados

Canada

El Salvador

Guatemala

Mexico

Nicaragua

Saint Kitts and Nevis

Trinidad and Tobago

United States

Oceania

Australia

Fiji

Nauru

New Zealand

Papua New Guinea

Solomon Islands

South America

Argentina

Bolivia

Brazil

Chile

Colombia

Ecuador

Guyana

Peru

See also
Politics and sport
List of actor-politicians

Notes

References

Lists of politicians
Politicians
Lists of people by second occupation
Sportsperson-politicians